April Kiss, also called Kiss of April, is a South Korean TV drama that aired from April 21 to July 8, 2004 on KBS.

Plot

Cast

Main
 Soo Ae - Song Chae-won
Seon Ji-hyun as young Song Chae-won
 A charming woman, who is also talented in arts. She majored in sculpture in college, and currently teaches at her private art school. One of the things that she cherishes the most is a pair of paddy birds that she received as a gift from her middle-school boyfriend. Every time Chae-won looks at the birds, she comes to recall her middle-school love. But she can't figure out if her feelings for Jeong-woo, her middle-class boyfriend, are her affection for him or simply a piece of memory. However, one thing is clear: she is currently with the guy named Kang Jae-sup. But one day, Jeong-woo shows up, and the two men find themselves embroiled in a whirlpool of love.

 Jo Han-sun - Kang Jae-sup
Yoo Ah-in as young Kang Jae-sup
 A man who possesses the charisma of an eagle. He learned about the importance of hard work and patience at a very young age. He succeeded in becoming a director at a renowned corporation solely through his hard work and abilities, and he firmly believes that everything in life is possible through a hard work. Jae-sup spent his childhood in utter poverty, and now he desperately strives to become rich and famous. One day, he even learns how to bake, and bakes a cake for Chae-won, who becomes very impressed. When his older brother, Jae-dong, who was always treated coldly by their father, tells him about his decision to marry a terminally ill woman, a café owner, who has only two years to live, Jae-sup eagerly supports his brother. Through that support, Jae-sup probably endeavors to realize his own yearning for a destined love.

 Lee Jung-jin - Han Jeong-woo
Kim Ki-bum as young Han Jeong-woo
 He has an aloof and careless personality, like a stork. But at the same time, he is a romantic and unceremonious person who seems to live apart from the tumult of the world and easily adapts to circumstances. He was raised in a financially well-off family, and he doesn't yearn for success that much. He believes that life is too short not to enjoy it and indulges in the pleasures of life, spending most of his time on his hobbies. He enjoys riding a bicycle in the forest and looking at birds. But one day, his life changes dramatically because of Chae-won and Jae-sup, and something that brings him to ruin.

 So Yi-hyun - Jang Jin-ah
 A daughter of the owner of Daejin Group, Jang Jin-ah is director of the Design Department and a college senior of Chae-won. She has an outgoing and self-confident personality underscored by her sophisticated looks. Since her childhood, she has despised her father's indulgence in women. That is why she does not believe in love and does not trust men. But the day she meets Jeong-woo, Jin-ah finds herself attracted to his unique romantic personality and good sense of humor.

Supporting
Koo Jun-yup as Kang Jae-dong
Lee Yoon-sung as Shim Soon-young
Kim In-moon as Kang Woon-bong, Jae-sup's father
Kwon Kwi-ok as Hong Mi-ryun
Lee Jung-gil as Dr. Han Tae-joon, Jeong-woo's father
Lee Hye-sook as Oh Shin-ja
Shin Choong-sik as Song Young-man, Chae-won's mother
Park Soon-chun as Seo In-sook, Jeong-woo's mother
Han In-soo as Chairman Jang Kap-sool
Kim Ji-yoo as Kang Jae-hee
Jang Tae-sung as Noh Kong-tak
Song Yoon-kyung as Han Jung-yeon

References

Korean Broadcasting System television dramas
2004 South Korean television series debuts
2004 South Korean television series endings
Korean-language television shows
South Korean romance television series